is a professional Japanese baseball player. He is a pitcher for the Hokkaido Nippon-Ham Fighters of Nippon Professional Baseball (NPB).

References 

1995 births
Living people
Baseball people from Yamagata Prefecture
Nippon Professional Baseball pitchers
Hanshin Tigers players
Hokkaido Nippon-Ham Fighters players
People from Higashine, Yamagata